Bus upgrade zones, commonly abbreviated to BUZ, are a feature of Brisbane's public transport system. The name is given to high-frequency bus routes operated by Transport for Brisbane, the Brisbane City Council agency that operates the city's public bus services for TransLink. All BUZ services run at least every fifteen minutes from around 6:00am to 11:30pm seven days a week and at least every ten minutes during peak hours from Monday to Friday.

Nearly all BUZ routes are express services which provide quick and frequent access to places along major trunk roads, with the exception of routes 196 and 199, which are the only all-stops BUZ service with bus stops within short walking distances of each other between the inner suburbs of Fairfield, West End, New Farm and Teneriffe. Most BUZ routes are radial, and commence in or near the Brisbane CBD. However, routes 196 and 199 are again an exception, in that they are cross-town routes that passes through the CBD.

History
Route 111 was upgraded to become the first BUZ service in December 2003. Other BUZ services have been progressively added since then. The Cultural Centre busway station on the South East Busway is the common interchange point for all BUZ services, with the exception of routes 340 and 412.

In 2007, BUZ services carried over 346,000 passengers a week, accounting for around 30% of all Brisbane Transport patronage. Route 199 being the busiest BUZ service, carrying over 53,000 passengers per week.

Routes
All BUZ services run at least every fifteen minutes from around 6:00am to 11:30pm seven days a week and at least every ten minutes during peak hours from Monday to Friday. Nearly all BUZ routes are express services which provide quick and frequent access to places along major trunk roads, with the exception of routes 196 and 199, which are the only all-stops BUZ services with bus stops within short walking distances of each other between the inner suburbs of West End and Teneriffe (199) and New Farm and Fairfield (196). All BUZ routes are radial, and commence in or near the Brisbane CBD. However, routes 196 and 199 are again an exception, in that they are cross-town routes that pass through the CBD.

See also
Transport for Brisbane
Busways in Brisbane
CityGlider
TransLink

References

Public transport in Brisbane
Bus transport brands